The EBSA European Under-21 Snooker Championships is the premier amateur junior snooker tournament in Europe. The event series is sanctioned by the European Billiards & Snooker Association. It took place first in 1997 and is held annually since then. The event was known as the EBSA European Under-19 Snooker Championships until 2010. In most years the winner of the tournament qualifies for the next two seasons of the World Snooker Tour as well as being awarded the Ebdon Trophy which is named in honour of former World Champion Peter Ebdon.

Winners

Statistics

Champions by country

See also
 EBSA European Snooker Championship
 EBSA European Under-18 Snooker Championships
 IBSF World Under-21 Snooker Championship
 World Snooker Tour

References

Snooker amateur competitions
Recurring sporting events established in 1997
1997 establishments in Jersey
EBSA Under-21 Championship
Snooker, under-21
Under-21 sport